Skořepa (Czech feminine: Skořepová) is a Czech surname. Notable people with the surname include:

 Allen C. Skorepa (1941–1998), American lichenologist
 Josef Skořepa (born 1981), Czech ice hockey player
 Luba Skořepová (1923–2016), Czech actress
 Zdeněk Skořepa (born 1976), Czech ice hockey player

See also
 

Czech-language surnames